Joe Fields (1929 – July 12, 2017) was an American producer and record executive, active mainly in jazz music.

Fields was born in Jersey City, New Jersey in 1929. He worked for Prestige Records as an executive in the 1960s. He and producer Don Schlitten cofounded Cobblestone Records, a subsidiary of Buddah Records, in 1972, and soon after founded Muse Records and its sister label Onyx Records. Schlitten split with Fields in 1978 to found the Xanadu label, after which Fields held sole control of Muse. Fields later sold Muse to Joel Dorn, who has released much of Muse's back catalog under the label 32 Jazz. Fields also owned the rights to the Savoy Records catalog for a time in the 1980s, having purchased the catalog from Arista Records, and subsequently selling it to Denon. (As of 2009, the library is controlled and distributed in the U.S. through Tokyo's Columbia Music Entertainment wholly owned Savoy Jazz label (the current owner of the Savoy Records masters.)

Fields and his son Barney Fields co-founded HighNote Records and Savant Records in 1996, which are still actively recording and issuing jazz. The HighNote roster is made up of many of the mainstay Muse artists, like Houston Person, Joey DeFrancesco, and Wallace Roney.

Fields died on July 12, 2017 at the age of 88.

References
Citations

General references
Scott Yanow, [ Joe Fields] at AllMusic

External links
 HighNote Records website 
 Muse Records discography

1929 births
2017 deaths
Date of birth missing
Record producers from New Jersey
Jazz record producers
People from Jersey City, New Jersey